Herb McQuay (died June 29, 2005) was a popular jazz and soul singer from New York who lived and worked in New Zealand during the late 1970s to the mid 1980s. He is remembered for his cover of the Edwin Starr song, "Oh How Happy", which was a minor hit for him.

Background
For a period of time, McQuay and his family resided in Auckland. While in New Zealand, he recorded an album and had a number of singles released. McQuay had also recorded radio jingles.

McQuay was born in New York. While in high school, he was a member of a street corner a cappella quartet. After high school, he studied music education at Shaw University. After he was drafted into the army in 1969.

Career

1970s
While in the Army, McQuay was a member of the Special Services Entertainment Division and went to  Korea, Vietnam, Okinawa and Thailand and to Germany. Later after heading back to New York, he was in Germany and then went around Europe.  He was later working cabaret as a result of getting a Managerial contact in Britain. His single "Runnin' Away From You", written by Colin Frechter and John Goodison, backed with his own composition "Storm Clouds" was released on the Bell label in 1974. He first arrived in New Zealand in 1975 or 1976. There he appeared at Auckland's Tanui Tavern By 1979, McQuay was hoping to settle in New Zealand permanently.

1980s
In 1980, his single "Oh How Happy" was released on the Ode label. In 1981, McQuay recorded his first album at Mandrill Studios. The album tracks included "Oh How Happy", "You Are The One", "Do Your Thing", "Hey Girl", "Mrs. Jones", "A Change Is Gonna Come, So  You Win Again", "Unchained Melody Blues" and Storm Clouds". Towards the end of that year, on the 18th of December, Ernestine Anderson, with Blue Market Quintet appeared at His Majesty's Theatre in Auckland. McQuay also appeared at the event. Around 1982, he narrated the New Zealand made documentary Flying Light.... In a Sky of Our Own, a Graham McLean production which featured hang gliding champion, Graeme Bird piloting a  microlight aircraft. Taj Mahal, provided music for the documentary. In 1983, his single "Night People" bw "Superstar was released. The record which was recorded at Mandrill Studios was produced by Richard Lush. On July 22, 1984, McQuay was appearing with his trio at the Auckland Art Gallery.

In 1986, after residing in New Zealand for four years, McQuay and his family left New Zealand for San Francisco.

Post New Zealand
In 1989, he was appearing at the Juniper Lounge at the High Sierra. He was there in May. Then he appeared later in the year. He was booked from the 26th of September to the first of October.

During the 80s, McQuay had worked with big names such as Smokey Robinson, Billy Dee Williams and The Brotherhood of Man. In New York, he appeared in productions such as Porgy and Bess and Bye Bye Birdie.

1990s onwards
He spent 10 years from 1995 to 2005 as a member of one of the versions of The Platters.

Death
He died on June 29, 2005, aged 56.

Discography

Film & television

References

1948 births
2005 deaths
American expatriates in New Zealand
American soul musicians
American jazz singers
20th-century African-American male singers